Hýskov is a municipality and village in Beroun District in the Central Bohemian Region of the Czech Republic. It has about 2,000 inhabitants.

Geography
It lies in the Křivoklát Highlands, and partly in the Křivoklátsko Protected Landscape Area. The municipality is situated on the left bank of the Berounka River.

History
The first written mention of Hýskov is from 1088, when the village was property of the Vyšehrad Chapter.

Transport
Hýskov is located on the railway line Beroun–Rakovník.

Sights
The landmark of Hýskov is the Church of the Nativity of the Virgin Mary. It was built in the Neoromanesque style in the 1840s.

Notable people
Otokar Feistmantel (1848–1891), geologist and paleontologist

References

External links

Villages in the Beroun District